Duplex septemtria is a moth of the family Erebidae first described by Michael Fibiger in 2008. It is known from Taiwan.

Adults have been found in May and July. The habitat consists of subtropical forests.

The wingspan is 7–8 mm. The forewing is relatively broad and the reniform stigma bright, ovoid and yellow. The hindwing is dark grey without a discal spot. The underside of both wings is unicolorous light brownish.

References

Micronoctuini
Taxa named by Michael Fibiger
Moths described in 2008